Nancy Gallardo is a pageant titleholder, was born in Guanare, Venezuela in 1968. She is the Miss Venezuela International titleholder for 1986, and was the official representative of Venezuela to the Miss International 1986 pageant held in Nagasaki, Japan, on September 7, 1986, when she classified in the Top 15 semifinalists.

Gallardo competed in the national beauty pageant Miss Venezuela 1986 and obtained the title of 1st runner up. She represented Portuguesa state.

References

External links
Miss Venezuela Official Website
Miss International Official Website

1968 births
Living people
People from Guanare
Miss Venezuela International winners
Miss International 1986 delegates